Eugen Cătălin Baciu (born 25 May 1980 in Vaslui) is a Romanian football player.

Club career
12 May 2001: Made his Divizia A debut in the FCM Bacău 2–0 defeat of Gloria Bistriţa.
Prior to joining Steaua București in 2004, he played for Laminorul Roman and FCM Bacău.
Steaua have signed Bacău's Eugen Baciu for a fee of €230,000.
He is not a first team regular at Steaua București, but when he is brought on the pitch, he does his job very well. He was brought at Steaua București as a replacement for the injured Mirel Rădoi, in 2004. The Steaua București fans did not think that he was good enough to play for this team. His evolutions were hesitant in his first season in Steaua București. He needed a longer period of adaptation. He started to shine in the 2006–2007 season of Liga 1, Mirel Rădoi and Sorin Ghionea being injured in its second part. He really got it going, but the fans still could not forget his hesitant evolutions in the last two seasons.
He had his best game on 2 October 2007, in Steaua București's 0–1 defeat against Arsenal in the Champions League. He was voted the best player on the pitch for Steaua București in that match, when he somehow managed to make a very good marking at Emmanuel Adebayor.
He is a very solid and tough centre back. Despite not being a regular of the first team, Baciu is always an option for the coach when either Dorin Goian or Sorin Ghionea are not available.
In the beginning of 2010–11 season, Baciu was demoted to the B squad after the arrival of new coach Victor Piţurcă. Soon after Piţurcă left the club, new coach Dumitrescu called him back to the first squad.
In June 2011, Baciu left Steaua.

International career
Baciu won a cap for Romania, in 2002, against Poland.

Titles

References

External links
 
 
 

1980 births
Living people
Sportspeople from Vaslui
Romanian footballers
Association football central defenders
Liga I players
FCM Bacău players
FC Steaua București players
FC Steaua II București players
Romania international footballers